Dakshinamoorthy Tamil Kumaran (born 24 November 1983) is an Indian first-class cricketer who plays for Tamil Nadu. He took most wickets in the 2006–07 Vijay Hazare Trophy, with a total of 16 dismissals from 7 matches.

References

External links
 

1983 births
Living people
Indian cricketers
Tamil Nadu cricketers
Tamil sportspeople